April Rain is the second full-length album by the Dutch symphonic metal band, Delain. It was released in the Benelux on 20 March 2009 and was released internationally on 30 March 2009 by Roadrunner Records. It was released in Australia on 10 April 2009.

History 
Martijn Westerholt, founder of Delain, originally did not intend Delain to be a live band. But after the success of debut album Lucidity a live band was created which recorded the album April Rain. While Delain's previous album Lucidity featured many guest appearances, this album has only two: Maria Ahn, cellist from the Ahn Trio and Finnish singer Marko Hietala, who was featured on multiple tracks of Lucidity as well. "Virtue and Vice" is the only song on April Rain containing death growls performed by guitarist Ronald Landa, who also contributes clean vocals on "Invidia".

Demo versions of "Stay Forever" and "Start Swimming" were already played live by Delain in 2007 and 2008. In November 2008, a version of the song "I'll Reach You" with alternate lyrics was performed live on a Dutch TV show to get attention for UNICEF & BT's "Inspiring Young Minds" charity.

The original release date for the album was 9 February 2009, but in January it was announced that the release was postponed to coincide with foreign release dates.

In February 2009, "April Rain" was revealed to be the first single from this album when it became available for purchase online.

On 13 March 2009, the Dutch website of Roadrunner Records put the entire album up for streaming, only available to residents of the Netherlands.

In October 2009, "Stay Forever" was announced as the second single from the album.

Track listing

Personnel 
Delain
Charlotte Wessels – vocals
Ronald Landa – guitars, vocals on track 3 and 6, backing vocals
Martijn Westerholt – keyboards, production
Rob van der Loo – bass guitar
Sander Zoer – drums

Additional musicians
Marko Hietala – vocals on tracks 4 and 11
Maria Ahn – cello on tracks 5 and 6
Guus Eikens – guitars on tracks 4, 5, 6 and 8
Oliver Philipps – guitar on all tracks except 6, orchestrations, production

Production
Jacob Hansen – engineering, mixing
Mark Jansen – photography
Joachim Ehrig – mastering
Dennis van der Meule – art direction, design
Hans de Ruiter – art direction, design

Charts

References

External links
 Delain Official Site
 Metallum Archives

2009 albums
Delain albums
Roadrunner Records albums